Kevin Charles Bass (born May 12, 1959) is a former American professional baseball right fielder who played in Major League Baseball for the Milwaukee Brewers (1982), Houston Astros (1982–1989, 1993–1994), San Francisco Giants (1990–1992), New York Mets (1992), and Baltimore Orioles (1995).

Career
The Milwaukee Brewers selected Bass in the second round of the 1977 MLB Draft. His MLB debut came on April 9, 1982. Bass was traded to the Houston Astros from Milwaukee with Frank DiPino and Mike Madden for Don Sutton on August 30, 1982. He played his final MLB game on October 1, 1995.

Bass was named to the  National League All-Star team, pacing the Astros with a .311 batting average, 20 home runs, 22 steals, and sterling defensive play. In Game 6 of the epic 1986 NLCS, he struck out swinging with men on first and second in the 16th inning, sealing a 7–6 victory for the Mets, allowing them to advance to the 1986 World Series.

On August 3, 1987, versus the San Francisco Giants, Bass became the 15th switch hitter in major league history to hit a home run from each side of the plate in the same game. In 1989, the Astros right fielder hit two grand slams in the season. The first homer stunned Cubs closer Mitch Williams, turning a 4–4 tie into an 8–4 Astros victory. The second homer, against Atlanta Braves reliever Mark Eichhorn on September 20, created a tie game that the Astros won in 14 innings.

Career statistics
In 1571 games over 14 seasons, Bass posted a .270 batting average (1308-for-4839) with 609 runs, 248 doubles, 40 triples, 118 home runs, 611 RBI, 151 stolen bases, 357 base on balls, .323 on-base percentage and .411 slugging percentage. He recorded a .982 fielding percentage at all three outfield positions.

Personal life
Born in Redwood City, California, Bass attended Menlo School before being drafted after he graduated. 

Two of Kevin's sons were selected in the 2007 MLB Draft. Garrett (Jacksonville State University) was selected by the Washington Nationals in the 42nd round and played a couple of seasons in their organization and then spent time in the independent minor leagues. Justin (Clements High School) was taken by the Los Angeles Angels in the 21st round and spent several seasons in Rookie and A League baseball.

He is a cousin of former American football player James Lofton. Bass is also the nephew of the late Stan Johnson, a former professional baseball player who played for the White Sox and the Athletics organizations.

See also
 Houston Astros award winners and league leaders

References

External links

Retrosheet
Venezuelan Professional Baseball League

1959 births
Living people
African-American baseball players
People from Redwood City, California
Baseball players from California
American expatriate baseball players in Canada
Major League Baseball right fielders
Baltimore Orioles players
Burlington Bees players
Holyoke Millers players
Houston Astros players
Leones del Caracas players
American expatriate baseball players in Venezuela
Milwaukee Brewers players
National League All-Stars
Newark Co-Pilots players
New York Mets players
Phoenix Firebirds players
San Francisco Giants players
San Jose Giants players
Tucson Toros players
Vancouver Canadians players
21st-century African-American people
20th-century African-American sportspeople